Valérie Boissier, comtesse de Gasparin (13 September 1813 – 1894) was a Swiss woman of letters. She was a spokeswoman in topics such as freedom, equality and creativity.

Biography
She was born at Geneva. She was the wife of Agénor de Gasparin. She lived a great part of her life in the canton of Vaud, Switzerland, and was a prolific writer on religion, social topics and travel. She was conspicuous as an opponent of religious and social innovations. Several of her books were translated into English, the books of 1859 being read very widely in the United States in their English form.

She opened with her husband the first nursing school in the world ; L’école La Source

Works
In addition to a number of translations of English and American authors, she published:
 Le mariage au point de vue chrétien, a work which won the Montyon prize from the French Academy (Marriage from the Christian Point of View, 1842)
 Allons faire fortune à Paris (Let's Go Make a Fortune in Paris, 1844)
 Un livre pour les femmes mariées (A Book for Wives, 1845)
 Il y a des pauvres à Paris et ailleurs, which also won the Montyon prize (There are Poor in Paris and Elsewhere, 1846)
 Quelques défauts des Chrétiens d'aujourd'hui (1853)
 Des corporations monastiques au sein du protestantisme (1855)
 Les horizons prochains (The Near Horizon, 1859)
 Les horizons célestes (The Heavenly Horizons, 1859)
 Vesper (1861)
 Les tristesses humaines (Human Sadness, 1863)
 Au bord de la mer (By the Sea Shore, 1866)
 La lèpre sociale (1870)
 Journey in the South by an Ignoramus
 Read and Judge, strictures on the Salvation Army
 Under French Skies or Sunny Fields and Shady Woods (1888)
 Edelweiss: poésies; l’auteur des horizons prochains (1890)
 Sur les montagnes (1890)

References

Sources
 
 
 

1813 births
1894 deaths
Swiss translators
Swiss countesses
Writers from Geneva
People from the canton of Vaud
Swiss non-fiction writers
19th-century translators
19th-century Swiss women writers
19th-century Swiss writers